Lawn darts (also known as Javelin darts, jarts, lawn jarts or yard darts) is a lawn game for two players or teams. A lawn dart set usually includes four large darts and two targets. The game play and objective are similar to those of both horseshoes and darts. The darts are typically 12 inches (30 cm) in length with a weighted metal or plastic tip on one end and three plastic fins on a rod at the other end. The darts are intended to be tossed underhand toward a horizontal ground target, where the weighted end hits first and sticks into the ground. The target is typically a plastic ring, and landing anywhere within the ring scores a point.

Starting in the late twentieth century, the safety of metal-tipped lawn darts was called into question in several countries. After thousands of injuries and at least three children's deaths were attributed to lawn darts, the sharp-pointed darts were banned for sale in the United States and Canada. They are still legal in the European Union.

Rules

The game may be played with standard or Handly Cup rules. Either variation can be played one-on-one or by teams of two.

In standard game play, points are scored when a dart lands in the target area. Usually if players from both teams land darts in the target, the scores cancel each other; for example, if Team A lands two darts in the target area and Team B lands one, Team A would get one point and Team B would get zero. Some versions of lawn darts include a smaller bullseye ring for additional points.

With the Handly Cup style, scores are based on darts in the ring plus darts closer to the ring than any of the opposing team's darts. Darts landing inside the ring, or "ringers", are worth three points each, and can be canceled by darts thrown by opponents that also land in the ring. Any dart that is closer to, but outside, the ring than any other dart thrown by the opposing team is worth one point. This means that if neither team managed to place a dart into the ring, but Team A landed two darts closer than did any of Team B's darts, Team A would score two points. If Team A landed one dart in the ring, and one dart closer than any of Team B's darts, Team A would score four points. If both teams land darts in the ring, it is impossible for a dart outside the ring to score any points, as it is farther from the ring than the opposing team's dart that is inside. If Team A and Team B each land a dart inside the ring, and Team A also lands a dart outside the ring but closer to the ring than Team B's other dart, neither team would score any points for the round. Handly Cup style matches are typically played by teams of two, with the pairs alternating until one team's total score is 21 or more. For a point to count, the dart must stick into the ground.

Safety and bans in the U.S. and Canada

In 1970, the U.S. Food and Drug Administration (FDA) classified sharp-pointed lawn darts as a "mechanical hazard," a designation which prohibited the sale of lawn darts, unless the darts satisfied three requirements: (1) Be packaged with specified warning label that advised of the potential for serious injury and cautioned parents to keep the product out of the reach of children, (2) Include instructions on usage with warnings to avoid use when other persons or animals are within the field of play, and (3) Not be sold in toy stores or toy departments. The Consumers Union and the Children's Foundation petitioned the Secretary of Health, Education and Welfare (HEW), a different agency, to go further, asking that HEW use the emergency provisions of the Child Protection and Toy Safety Act of 1969 to ban outright, in addition to several other toys, "outdoor games with 13‐inch pointed darts weighing more than five ounces each." When HEW refused, Consumers Union sued, seeking a judicial order instructing HEW to enact the ban; on December 18, 1970, a federal judge held in favor of HEW.

On April 5, 1987, seven-year-old Michelle Snow was killed by a lawn dart thrown by one of her brothers' playmates in the backyard of their home in Riverside, California, when the dart  penetrated her skull and caused massive brain trauma. The darts had been purchased as part of a set of several different lawn games and were stored in the garage, never having been played before the incident occurred. Snow's father David began to advocate for a ban on lawn darts, claiming that there was no way to keep children from accessing lawn darts short of a full ban, and, partly as a result of Snow's lobbying, on December 19, 1988, the U.S. Consumer Product Safety Commission introduced an outright ban on lawn darts in the U.S. In the previous eight years, 6,100 Americans had visited hospital emergency rooms as the result of lawn-dart accidents. Of that total, 81% were 15 or younger, and half were 10 or younger. During the week when the commission voted to ban the product, an 11-year-old girl in Tennessee was hit by a lawn dart and fell into a coma.

In Canada, lawn darts caused at least 55 serious injuries. They were banned for sale in the country from July 1989. The sale of second-hand lawn darts is also illegal under the Hazardous Products Act. Since then, alternatives have surfaced that are available for sale in Canada and are made of plastic. As of 2020, a modified, safer version of lawn darts with a modified blunt-tip design may be purchased in the United States.

See also
 
 Lawn dart effect
 Plumbata
 Khuru (sport)

References

Lawn games
Darts variants
Throwing games
Toy recalls